Worcestershire Wildlife Trust is one of 46 wildlife trusts throughout the United Kingdom. It was founded in 1968 to conserve, protect and restore the county's wildlife.

The Trust owns and manages over 70 nature reserves across the county, part of their vision for a Living Landscape for Worcestershire.  By working with other landowners, managers and communities the Trust aims to restore, recreate and reconnect fragmented natural habitats to achieve a landscape where wildlife can flourish and people can lead happier and healthier lives.

The Trust has nearly 20,000 members and more than 350 volunteers.

The Trust cares for over 70 nature reserves in Worcestershire totalling about 2000 acres (8 km2). These include:

Brotheridge Green Nature Reserve
Chaddesley Woods NNR
Christopher Cadbury Wetland Reserve (popularly called "Upton Warren")
Devil's Spittleful and Rifle Range
Feckenham Wylde Moor
Fosters Green Meadows NNR
Grafton Wood
Hollybed Farm Meadows
Hunthouse Wood
Knapp and Papermill
Laight Rough
Lower Smite Farm
Monkwood
Newbourne Wood
Piper's Hill & Dodderhill Common (known locally as Hanbury Woods)
Trench Wood
Tiddesley Wood
Wilden Marsh

Worcestershire Wildlife Trust is part of The Wildlife Trusts partnership, the UK's largest charity network dedicated to conserving all our habitats and species.  Working towards a UK rich in wildlife, where everyone can appreciate, enjoy and help restore and protect wildlife for the future.

External links

 Worcestershire Wildlife Trust

Organisations based in Worcestershire
Wildlife Trusts of England
1968 establishments in England
Organizations established in 1968
Nature reserves in Worcestershire